Greenwood Elementary School, also known as the City School No. 21, is a historic elementary school building located at Terre Haute, Vigo County, Indiana. It was built in 1907–1908, and is a two-story, Classical Revival style brick building on a raised basement.  It features two-story pilasters, broken pediments, and round arches on the interior.  The building measures approximately 23,800 square feet.  The building ceased use as a school in May 1988.

It was listed on the National Register of Historic Places in 1997.

References

School buildings on the National Register of Historic Places in Indiana
Neoclassical architecture in Indiana
School buildings completed in 1908
Schools in Vigo County, Indiana
Buildings and structures in Terre Haute, Indiana
National Register of Historic Places in Terre Haute, Indiana
1908 establishments in Indiana